Barbara Bodichon Ayrton-Gould (née Ayrton; 3 April 1886 – 14 October 1950) was a British Labour politician and suffragist who served as the Member of Parliament (MP) for Hendon North from 1945 to 1950.

Background and family life
Ayrton-Gould was born in Kensington, London, the daughter of prominent electrical engineers and inventors Hertha Marks Ayrton and William Edward Ayrton. She was educated at Notting Hill High School, and studied chemistry and physics at University College, London. She married the writer Gerald Gould (1885–1936); the artist Michael Ayrton (1921–1975) was their son. Until 1930, Gould worked as publicity manager of the Daily Herald.

Suffrage work

In 1906, she became a member of the Women's Social and Political Union and gave up her science research to be a full-time organizer for them by 1909. She wrote the pro-suffrage pamphlet The Democratic Plea for the Men's Political Union for Women's Enfranchisement.

In March 1912, Ayrton-Gould participated in smashing store windows in the West End of London for suffrage, for which she served time in prison. On her release, in 1913, she went to France, disguised as a schoolgirl, so she would not be arrested again.

In 1914, Ayrton-Gould left the Women's Social and Political Union due to frustration with the autocratic tendencies of their leaders, as well as Christabel Pankhurst's continuing absence. On 6 February 1914, she, her husband, and Evelyn Sharp founded the United Suffragists, notable for accepting both male and female members. The United Suffragists ended their campaign when 1918's Representation of the People Act gave women limited suffrage in the United Kingdom.

Political office
Ayrton-Gould became a member of the National Executive Committee of the Labour Party in 1929, and served as vice-Chair in 1938 and Chair of the Labour Party from 1939 to 1940. As from 1922, she made four unsuccessful attempts to get elected as MP. During the general election of 1929 she missed victory in Northwich by only four votes. The fifth time, Gould was elected Member of Parliament for newly created Hendon North constituency in Labour's landslide victory of 1945. The forerunner constituency, Hendon, had since 1935 grown considerably in population (and to some extent number of homes) and was split in two; it had been solidly won by Conservative candidates since 1910, however the north division fell to Gould's campaign, a feat not to be repeated until 1997 by a Labour candidate. In Parliament, the two main issues of Gould's concern were food supplies and child poverty. Thus, she succeeded in introducing a resolution which called for a government enquiry into child neglect. She also was a Justice of the Peace in Marylebone.

Ayrton-Gould held the seat until losing the next general election (in 1950), when it was gained by Ian Orr-Ewing (Con). She withdrew as prospective candidate for the constituency in September because of ill health. A month later Gould died, eight months after leaving the House of Commons.

References

Bibliography

External links 
 

1886 births
1950 deaths
British people of Polish-Jewish descent
Labour Party (UK) MPs for English constituencies
Female members of the Parliament of the United Kingdom for English constituencies
UK MPs 1945–1950
Alumni of University College London
People educated at Notting Hill & Ealing High School
Chairs of the Labour Party (UK)
20th-century British women politicians
Barbara
Women's Social and Political Union